Germaine is a commune in the Marne department in north-eastern France.

Wine production

Germaine is part of the Champagne wine region. Moët & Chandon have vineyards in Germaine. In 2008 it was proposed to redraw the region boundaries, excluding Germaine. As of 2019, the change had not happened, with a final decision expected in 2024.

See also

Communes of the Marne department
Montagne de Reims Regional Natural Park

References

Communes of Marne (department)